David L. Robbins (born July 4, 1950) is an American author of English and Pennsylvania Dutch descent.  He writes both fiction and non-fiction.  He has written over three hundred books under his own name and many pen names, among them:  David Thompson, Jake McMasters, Jon Sharpe, Don Pendleton, Franklin W. Dixon, Ralph Compton, Dean L. McElwain, J.D. Cameron and John Killdeer.

He has written for the following series: The Trailsman, Mack Bolan, Endworld, Blade, Wilderness, White Apache, Davy Crockett, Omega Sub and The Hardy Boys Casefiles.  Robbins is a member of the Science Fiction and Fantasy Writers of America, the Horror Writers Association, and Western Writers of America.

Biography

Robbins was raised in Pennsylvania.  Until he was eight he lived in an outlying area of Philadelphia.  Robbins spent many of his teen years on a farm owned by his Mennonite great aunt and uncle in Pennsylvania Dutch country. Water was brought in from an outdoor pump, and they used an outhouse.

At seventeen Robbins enlisted in the United States Air Force and became a sergeant.  After his honorable discharge he attended college and went into broadcasting.  He worked as an announcer and engineer and later as a program director at various radio stations.  Later still he entered law enforcement and then took to writing full-time.

At one time or another Robbins has lived in Pennsylvania, Texas, Oklahoma, Kansas, Montana, Colorado and the Pacific Northwest. He spent a year and a half in Europe, traveling through France, Italy, Greece and Germany.  He lived for more than a year in Turkey.

His writing has been critically praised by the Pulp Rack, among others.  He is known for two current long-running series.
Wilderness is the generational saga of a Mountain Man and his Shoshone wife.  Started in 1990 under his David Thompson pen name, the series has nearly eighty books to date. Robbins has since stopped using pen names on his own works, and WILDERNESS is now under his own name.
Endworld is a science fiction series under his own name started in 1986.  There are forty-two books, and it is still being published.

His works have been published in nine languages.

Robbins suffers from familial hemiplegic migraine. His father had the same condition, and would isolate himself in a dark room for days at a time to recover. Robbins' eyes are extremely light sensitive, and for years he has worn custom prescription Aviator sunglasses to reduce the frequency of the attacks.

Bibliography

Single novels as David Robbins
 The Return Of The Virginian
 Diablo
 Blood Feud
 Thunder Valley
 Town Tamers
 Angel l U: Let There Be Light
 Ride To Valor
 Badlanders
 Guns on the Prairie
 Angel U: Demigod
 Hit Radio

Endworld
Written as David Robbins

Endworld is a Scifi series launched in 1986 under the name David Robbins. The novels take place in a post-apocalyptic United States.

Blade
Blade is a 13 novel sequel to Endworld written as David Robbins.
First Strike
Outlands Strike
Vampire Strike
Pipeline Strike
Pirate Strike
Crusher Strike
Terror Strike
Devil Strike
L.A. Strike
Dead Zone Strike
Quest Strike
Death Master Strike
Vengeance Strike

Suspense
 Blood Cult

Horror novels
Written as David Robbins
 The Wereling
 The Wrath
 Spectre
 Hell-O-Ween
 Prank Night
 Spook Night
 A Girl, The End Of The World And Everything

Movie adaptations
 Men Of Honor
 Proof Of Life
 Twisted

Non-fiction
 Heavy Traffic

Wilderness
Written as David Thompson

Giant Wilderness
 Hawken Fury
 Season Of The Warrior
 Prairie Blood
 Ordeal
 The Trail West
 Frontier Strike
 Spanish Slaughter

White Apache
Written as: Jake McMasters
 Hangman's Knot
 Warpath
 Warrior Born
 Quick Killer
 Blood Bath
 Blood Treachery
 Blood Bounty
 The Trackers
 Desert Fury
 Hanged

Davy Crockett
Written as: David Thompson
 Homecoming
 Sioux Slaughter
 Blood Hunt
 Mississippi Mayhem
 Blood Rage
 Comanche Country
 Texican Terror
 Cannibal Country

Compton Novels
Written as Ralph Compton
 Do Or Die
 Nowhere, Tx
 Bucked Out In Dodge
 West Of Pecos
 For The Brand
 By The Horns
 Rio Largo
 A Wolf In The Fold
 Bluff City
 Blood Duel
 Bullet For A Badman
 Ride The Hard Trail
 Fatal Justice
The Evil Men Do
Brother's Keeper
The Law and the Lawless
Texas Hills

The Executioner
Written as Don Pendleton
 #169: White Heat
 #178: Black Hand
 #191: Extreme Force
 #199: Rogue Agent
 #230: Deep Attack
 #267: Invisible Invader
 #294: Scorpion Rising
 #313: Lockdown
 #322: Time Bomb

SuperBolans
Written as Don Pendleton
 #44: Shock Tactic
 #46: Precision Kill
 #51: Thermal Strike
 #61: Blood Feud
 #68: Code of Conflict
 #75: Evil Alliance
 #82: War Load
 #90: Age of War

The Trailsman
Written as Jon Sharpe

Giant Trailsman
 Woodland Warriors
 New Mexico Nightmare
 Menagerie Of Malice
 Island Devils
 Idaho Blood Spur
 Desert Duel (Feb. 07)

Mountain Majesty
 #7: Fire On The Prairie
 #8: The Savage Land

Preacher's Law
 #5: Slaughter At Ten Sleep

Omega Sub
 #2: Command Decision
 #4: Blood Tide
 #5: Death Dive
 #6: Raven Rising

The Hardy Boys Casefiles
Written as: Franklin W. Dixon
57: Terror on Track

References

External links

 David L. Robbins, Author (archived 2015-10-09, homepage maybe identical to 2008-10-06) 
 
 

20th-century American novelists
21st-century American novelists
American male novelists
1950 births
Living people
Novelists from Oregon
20th-century American male writers
21st-century American male writers